Belo Horizonte Metro is a rapid transit system serving the city of Belo Horizonte, in the state of Minas Gerais in Brazil. The system has one  line which serves 19 stations. The Metro carried 54.4 million passengers in 2019, or approximately 150,000 passengers per day. The system is operated by Companhia Brasileira de Trens Urbanos (CBTU). Two more lines are planned.

History 
The first section of the metro opened on 1 August 1986. In 1987 the line was extended to Central station and two more trains were brought into use. The line was extended again several times in the mid-1990s, and finally once more in 2002 adding the last 5 of the current 19 stations.

Further trains were delivered in the 1990s, with the last being delivered in December 2001, bringing the total number of trains to 25.

Operations

Network

System characteristics 

Future service
The transfer of the administration of Belo Horizonte Metro from Companhia Brasileira de Trens Urbanos to MetroMinas is yet to be discussed.

In early 2014, it was announced that the Belo Horizonte Metro will be expanded with two new lines by 2018, with new train cars, and two additional stations added to Line 1.

In September 2015, ten new train cars was introduced officially.

No progress was made in respect of expansion of the network until September 2020, when the Brazilian government committed 1.2 billion reais of funding for the construction of Line 2.

Planned expansion proposed by CBTU

Planned expansion proposed by State Government

Network Map

See also 
 List of metro systems
 Rapid transit in Brazil

References

External links

Metro
Rapid transit in Brazil
5 ft 3 in gauge railways in Brazil
Transport in Minas Gerais
Electric railways in Brazil
3000 V DC railway electrification
1986 establishments in Brazil